Autódromo Internacional Ayrton Senna is a  motorsports circuit located in Londrina, Brazil. Opened in 1992, it hosts motor racing events for the Formula Three Sudamericana and Formula Renault series.

Lap records

The official fastest lap records at the Autódromo Internacional Ayrton Senna (Londrina) are listed as:

References

External links
Map and circuit history at RacingCircuits.info

Londrina
Londrina
Things named after Ayrton Senna